The Stanley Hotel is a 140-room Colonial Revival hotel in Estes Park, Colorado, United States, about five miles from the entrance to Rocky Mountain National Park. It was built by Freelan Oscar Stanley, Co-founder of the Stanley Motor Carriage Company, and opened on July 4, 1909, as a resort for upper-class Easterners and a health retreat for sufferers of pulmonary tuberculosis. The hotel and its surrounding structures are listed on the National Register of Historic Places. Today, the hotel includes a restaurant, spa, and bed-and-breakfast; with panoramic views of Lake Estes, the Rockies, and Longs Peak.

The Stanley Hotel inspired the Overlook Hotel in Stephen King's 1977 bestselling novel The Shining and its 1980 film adaptation, and was a filming location for the related 1997 TV miniseries.

History
In 1903, the steam-powered car inventor Freelan Oscar Stanley (1849–1940) was stricken with a life-threatening resurgence of tuberculosis. The most highly recommended treatment of the day was fresh, dry air with much sunlight and a hearty diet. Therefore, like many "lungers" of his day, Stanley resolved to take the curative air of the Rocky Mountains. He and his wife Flora arrived in Denver, Colorado, in March and, in June, on the recommendation of Dr. Sherman Grant Bonney, moved to Estes Park, Colorado, for the rest of the summer. Over the season, Stanley's health improved dramatically. Impressed by the beauty of the valley and grateful for his recovery, he decided to return every year. He lived to 91, dying of a heart attack in Newton, Massachusetts, one year after his wife, in 1940.

By 1907, Stanley had recovered completely. However, not content with the rustic accommodations, lazy pastimes and relaxed social scene of their new summer home, Stanley resolved to turn Estes Park into a resort town. In 1907, construction began on the Hotel Stanley, a 48-room grand hotel that catered to the class of moderately wealthy urbanites who composed the Stanleys' social circle back east as well as to consumptives seeking the healthful climate.

The land was purchased in 1908 through the representatives of The 4th Earl of Dunraven and Mount-Earl, the Anglo-Irish peer who had originally acquired it by stretching the provisions of the Homestead Act of 1862 and pre-emption rights. Between 1872 and 1884, Lord Dunraven claimed  of the Estes Valley in an unsuccessful attempt to create a private hunting preserve, making him one of the largest foreign holders of American lands. Unpopular with the local ranchers and farmers, Dunraven left the area in 1884, relegating the ranch to the management of an overseer. Dunraven's presence in Colorado was parodied in Charles King's novel Dunraven Ranch (1892) and James A. Michener's Centennial (1974). His reputation was such that, when Stanley suggested "The Dunraven" as a name for his new hotel, 180 people signed a buckskin petition requesting that he name it for himself instead.

The main hotel and concert hall were completed in 1909 and the Manor in 1910. To bring guests from the nearest train depot in the foothills town of Lyons, Colorado, Stanley's car company produced a fleet of specially-designed steam-powered vehicles called Mountain Wagons that seated multiple passengers.  Stanley operated the hotel almost as a pastime, remarking once that he spent more money than he made each summer.

In 1926, Stanley sold his hotel to a private company incorporated for the sole purpose of running it. The venture failed and, in 1929, Stanley purchased his property out of foreclosure selling it again, in 1930, to fellow automobile and hotel magnate, Roe Emery of Denver. Until 1983, the resort was only open during the summer, shutting down for the winter every year. The presence of the hotel and Stanley's own involvement greatly contributed to the growth of Estes Park (incorporated in 1917) and the creation of the Rocky Mountain National Park (established in 1915).

The hotel was a member of Historic Hotels of America, a program of the National Trust for Historic Preservation, but in 2022 it is not.

1911 gas explosion
Upon opening, the hotel was alleged to be one of the few in the world powered entirely by electricity. However, lack of available power induced the installation of an auxiliary gas lighting system in June 1911. On June 25 – the day after the pipes had been filled – an explosion occurred that injured a maid and damaged the structure, though contemporary newspaper articles differ on certain details.

A brief article telegraphed to the York Dispatch (of York, Pennsylvania) and circulated by the Associated Press the following day said:

When the Lancaster paper reprinted the story, the editor noted that Elizabeth Wilson's name did not appear in local directories and she could not be identified as a Lancastrian. Similar accounts in local Colorado papers give the maid's name as Elizabeth Lambert and convey various dramatic details that are not confirmed by other articles. The most comprehensive and detailed article on the incident appeared on June 29 in the Fort Collins Express and seems to be the most accurate – positively refuting that the maid had been "hurled from the second to the first floor"

Gallery

Architecture
The Stanley Hotel National Register Historic District contains 11 contributing structures including the main hotel, the concert hall, a carriage house, manager's cottage, gate house and The Lodgea smaller bed-and-breakfast originally called Stanley Manor. The buildings were designed by F.O. Stanley with the professional assistance of Denver architect T. Robert Wieger, Henry "Lord Cornwallis" Rogers, and contractor Frank Kirchoff. The site was chosen for its vantage overlooking the Estes valley and Long's Peak within the National Park. The main building, concert hall and Manor House are steel-frame structures on foundations of random rubble granite with clapboard siding and asphalt shingle roof. Originally, Stanley chose a yellow ocher color for the buildings' exteriors with white accents and trim. Lumber used in the structures was harvested from the areas of Bierstadt Lake and Hidden Valley in the future national park, and purchased from Kirchoff's Lumberyard in Denver and Bluff City Lumber Company of Pine Bluff, Arkansas. The granite was quarried from the Baldwin property near the confluence of Beaver Brook and the Big Thompson River. Non-local materials were brought to Lyons, Colorado by rail and thence to Estes Park by mule-drawn wagon.

Upon opening in 1909, the hotel was alleged to be one of first in the country to be fully electrified from the lighting to the kitchens (although some fixtures could be operated with either electricity or gas). To supply his hotel with power, Stanley led the construction of the Fall River Hydroplant which also brought electricity to the town of Estes Park for the first time. Every guest room had a telephone and each pair of rooms shared an en suite bathroom with running water supplied by Black Canyon Creek, which had been dammed in 1906. Circa 1935, during Roe Emery's tenure as owner the ochre-colored siding was painted white and most of the original electro-gas fixtures were replaced.

Although the style of the hotel evokes the historical architecture of New England, the general form and layout are designed to accommodate contemporary notions of hygiene and comfort. Given Stanley's interest in architectural design and healthful living, he may have been inspired by the Carolina Hotel (built 1899–1900) in Pinehurst, North Carolina, designed by Bertrand E. Taylor (1856–1909)a national leader in hospital design and, like Stanley, a resident of Newton, Massachusetts. The parallels between the Carolina and the Stanley extend beyond style; the builder of the Carolina, James Walker Tufts, was a Boston soda magnate who initially developed Pinehurst as a health resort for people with pulmonary diseases. Whether or not Stanley had exposure to Taylor's work and ideas, it is certain that he was influenced by Dr. Sherman Grant Bonney of the University of Denver, a contemporary expert in the treatment of tuberculosis; Stanley's Estes Park summer house is illustrated in Bonney's book, Pulmonary Tuberculosis (published while the hotel was under construction), and Stanley himself is acknowledged in the preface for his "interest and efficiency in connection with the photographic illustrations." Although the hotel never operated as a sanitarium per se, it was designed to be an optimal environment for pulmonary health. When the construction plans were announced, the Fort Collins Weekly Courier reported, "[Estes Park] has been a favorite place for doctors to send the more robust of their patients, who were in shape to be braced up by the keen air and the considerable altitude, but it has not always been possible to get suitable accommodations and surroundings for them. With the park turned into a vast pleasure ground, and ample provisions for the best food products, all precious objections will be dissipated." Accordingly, the facilities were sited and designed to meet the requirements expounded in Bonney's book. For instance, according to Bonney,

This text is accompanied by a photograph of "the delightful view afforded from the porches of cottages for consumptives in Estes Park, Colorado." The hotel also provided the ample porches, ventilation, southern exposure, and appetizing food recommended in Bonney's book.

The style of the Stanley Hotel campus is colonial revival. The strong symmetrical arrangement of the primary facade, and the classically derived ornamental articulations such as the two-stage octagonal cupola, Palladian window, fanlights, dormers, swan's neck pediments, scroll brackets, paired Tuscan columns, oval ox-eye windows, and elaborately turned balusters are all stylistic hallmarks of the so-called American Georgian and Federal Styles. The clapboard siding and carved wood elements are characteristic of New England's regional building practices. And yet, these features are modified and arranged to accommodate the tastes and lifestyles of the early twentieth century.

The style of the hotel contrasts sharply with the rustic style used for the other hotels in Estes Park, before and after the Stanley's construction. However, it was not an uncommon choice for a hotel of the Stanley's size and quality in the time period (e.g. Royal Poinciana Hotel, Lake Yellowstone Hotel, Mount Washington Hotel). In general, the colonial revival symbolized the historical roots of modern American cultural values and the positive progress of American civilization. By this token, the Stanley Hotel was an expression of the modest gentility of the builder and his clientele, an advertisement for the modern comforts contained within it, and a beacon for the future of Estes Park as a respectable resort town. All of these connotations were heightened in contrast with the ruggedness of the Rocky Mountains and the rusticity of the other hotels in the area.

Main building
The floor plan of the main hotel (completed 1909) was laid out to accommodate the various activities popular with the American upper class at the turn of the twentieth century and the spaces are decorated accordingly. The music room, for instance, with its cream-colored walls (originally green and white), picture windows and fine, classical plaster-work was designed for letter-writing during the day and chamber music at night – cultured pursuits perceived as feminine. On the other hand, the smoking lounge (today the Piñon Room) and adjoining billiard room, with their dark stained-wood elements and granite arch fireplace were designated for enjoyment by male guests. Stanley himself, having been raised in a conservative household and having recovered from a serious lung disease, did not smoke cigars or drink alcohol, but these were essential after-dinner activities for most men at the time. Billiards, however, was among Stanley's most cherished pastimes.

With no central heating or ventilation system, the structure was designed to facilitate natural airflow; the Palladian window at the top of the grand stair could be opened to induce a cross-breeze through the lobby, French doors in all the public spaces open onto verandas, and two curving staircases connecting the guest corridors prevent stagnant air in the upper floors. Although the main hotel is now heated in the winter, guests still depend on natural ventilation for cooling in the summer. Within a few years of opening, a hydraulic elevator was put in operation. In 1916, the east wing of the main building was extended in the rear adding several guest rooms. Around this time, the alcove of the music room was added. In 1921, a rear veranda was enclosed forming a room that currently serves as a gift shop. Around 1935, the hydraulic elevator system was replaced with a cable-operated system and extended to the fourth floor necessitating the addition of a secondary cupola to house the mechanical apparatus. Originally, a porte-cochère extended from the central bay of the front porch, but this was removed when the south terrace was converted into a parking lot. In 1983, a service tunnel was excavated, connecting the basement-level corridor to the staff entrance. It is cut directly through the living granite on which the hotel rests.

Concert hall
The concert hall, east of the hotel, was built by Stanley in 1909 with the assistance of Henry "Lord Cornwallis" Rogers, the same architect who designed his summer cottage. According to popular legend, it was built by F.O. Stanley as a gift for his wife, Flora. The interior is decorated in the same manner as the music room in the main hotel and vaguely resembles that of the Boston Symphony Hall (McKim, Mead & White, 1900) with which the Stanleys would have been familiar. The stage features a trap door, used for theatrical entrances and exits. The lower level once housed a two-lane bowling alley which was removed during the ownership of Maxwell Abbell. It possibly resembled the bowling alley at the Stanley's Hunnewell Club in Newton, pictures of which are archived in the Newton Free Library. The hall underwent extensive repair and renovation in the 2000s.

The Lodge

Once called Stanley Manor, this smaller hotel between the main structure and the concert hall is a 2:3 scaled-down version of the main hotel. Unlike its model, the manor was fully heated from completion in 1910 which may indicate that Stanley planned to use it as a winter resort when the main building was closed for the season. However, unlike many other Colorado mountain towns now famous for their winter sports, Estes Park never attracted off-season visitors in Stanley's day and the manor remained empty for much of the year. Today it is called The Lodge and it features a brunch restaurant and is open to guests as another location to stay on the property.

The Shining

In 1974, during their brief residency in Boulder, Colorado, horror writer Stephen King and his wife Tabitha spent one night at the Stanley Hotel. The visit is known entirely through interviews given by King in which he presents differing narratives of the experience. At the time of his visit, King was writing a book with the working title Darkshine set in an amusement park, but was not satisfied with the setting. According to George Beahm's Stephen King Companion, "on the advisement of locals who suggested a resort hotel located in Estes Park, an hour's drive away to the north, Stephen and Tabitha King found themselves checking in at the Stanley Hotel just as its other guests were checking out, because the hotel was shutting down for the winter season. After checking in and after Tabitha went to bed, King roamed the halls and went down to the hotel bar, where drinks were served by a bartender named Grady. As he returned to his room, numbered 217, his imagination was fired up by the hotel's remote location, its grand size, and its eerie desolation. Later, when King went into the bathroom and pulled back the pink curtain for the tub, which had claw feet, he thought, 'What if somebody died here? At that moment, I knew I had a book.

In a 1977 interview by the Literary Guild, King recounted "While we were living [in Boulder] we heard about this terrific old mountain resort hotel and decided to give it a try. But when we arrived, they were just getting ready to close for the season, and we found ourselves the only guests in the placewith all those long, empty corridors." King and his wife were served dinner in an empty dining room accompanied by canned orchestral music: "Except for our table all the chairs were up on the tables. So the music is echoing down the hall, and, I mean, it was like God had put me there to hear that and see those things. And by the time I went to bed that night, I had the whole book [The Shining] in my mind." In another retelling, King said "I dreamed of my three-year-old son running through the corridors, looking back over his shoulder, eyes wide, screaming. He was being chased by a fire-hose. I woke up with a tremendous jerk, sweating all over, within an inch of falling out of bed. I got up, lit a cigarette, sat in a chair looking out the window at the Rockies, and by the time the cigarette was done, I had the bones of The Shining firmly set in my mind."

The Shining was published in 1977 and became the third great success of King's career after Carrie and 'Salem's Lot. The primary setting is an isolated Colorado resort named the Overlook Hotel which closes for the winter. In the front matter of the book, King tactfully states "Some of the most beautiful resort hotels in the world are located in Colorado, but the hotel in these pages is based on none of them. The Overlook and the people associated with it exist wholly in the author's imagination."

Film location and venue
The Stanley Hotel served as the fictional hotel and filming location for Danbury of Aspen, Colorado, in the 1994 film Dumb and Dumber.

The Shining, a three-part miniseries and horror tv-adaptation, was written and produced by Stephen King, based on his 1977 novel of the same name, which had been largely inspired by the Stanley Hotel. The miniseries was produced by King, who had been dissatisfied with Stanley Kubrick's 1980 film. Unlike Kubrick's version, the miniseries, directed by Mick Garris, was filmed at the Stanley Hotel, which stood in for the fictional "Overlook Hotel", located in the Colorado Rockies. Film production started in March 1996, with the first episode being released in March 1997. The miniseries ultimately received mixed but mostly negative reviews from the public and critics, with it currently averaging 36% on Rotten Tomatoes.

From 2013 to 2015, the hotel hosted the Stanley Film Festival, an independent horror film festival operated by the Denver Film Society, held in early May. The festival featured screenings, panels, student competitions, audience awards and receptions. The Stanley Film Festival was put on hiatus in 2016 and canceled for 2017.

Bravo's cooking competition Top Chef also used the Stanley as a venue for Episode 10 of Season 15, which took place in various locations around Colorado.

Indie rock band Murder by Death have performed an annual series of winter concerts at the Stanley Hotel since 2014, with the 2020 edition being their seventh such event.

Haunted reputation

Despite a peaceful early history, in the years following the publication of The Shining, the Stanley Hotel gained a reputation as a setting for paranormal activity. It has hosted numerous paranormal investigators and appeared in shows such as Ghost Hunters and Ghost Adventures. The hotel also offers guided tours which feature spaces reputed to be exceptionally active.

Famous guests
The Stanley Hotel has hosted the following persons of note:
 1934, Erich Fromm, the German psychoanalyst
 1936, Gov. Alf Landon (R, Kansas) while running for president against Franklin Delano Roosevelt
 1974, Stephen King, author who was inspired to write The Shining after his stay in room 217
 1976, Bob Dylan and Joan Baez, folk revival icons during the Rolling Thunder Revue tour
 1994, Emperor Akihito of Japan, Empress Michiko and Crown Prince Naruhito, on a state visit to the U.S.
 1994, Dumb and Dumber cast and crew including Jim Carrey and Jeff Daniels
 1996, The Shining cast and crew including Rebecca De Mornay and Steven Weber
 2018, YouTube stars, Shane Dawson, Ryland Adams, and Morgan Adams travel to film a two part series
 2019, YouTube stars, “Sam and Colby” travel to film a 6 part series
 2019, former BuzzFeed Unsolved creator and producer, Ryan Bergara and co-host Shane Madej, while filming a "Dare To Go Back" episode for Warner Bros.'s Doctor Sleep (2019), a sequel to The Shining (1980)
 2022, YouTube star Danny Gonzalez, travelled to The Stanley Hotel to work out if ghosts were actually present.

Ownership history

 1908–1926, Freelan Oscar Stanley
 1926–1929, The Stanley Corporation
 1929–1930, Freelan Oscar Stanley
 1930–1946, Roe Emery
 1946–1966, Abbell Management Company (later Abbell Hotel Company), run by Maxwell Abbell, Chicago real estate investor
 ?–1969, Stanley Properties, Inc., headed by Maurice L. Albertson, civil engineer at Colorado State University
 1969–?, Richard R. Holechek, Charles F. Hanson and Carol Hanson Pick of Riverside and Palm Springs, California
 ?-1974, Estes Park Trustees 
 1974–1995, Frank Normali (Complete Restoration Period)
 1995–present, Grand Heritage Hotel Group.

See also

 List of Historic Hotels of America

References

External links

Stanley Hotel National Register Nomination
Colorado Experience: The Stanley Hotel by Rocky Mountain PBS

Hotel buildings on the National Register of Historic Places in Colorado
Buildings and structures in Larimer County, Colorado
Reportedly haunted locations in Colorado
Neoclassical architecture in Colorado
Estes Park, Colorado
Tourist attractions in Larimer County, Colorado
Historic districts on the National Register of Historic Places in Colorado
National Register of Historic Places in Larimer County, Colorado
The Shining (franchise)
Former member hotels of Historic Hotels of America